Attari Shyam Singh railway station is located in Amritsar district in the Indian state of Punjab and serves Attari and the Wagah border with Pakistan.

In May 2015, Government of Punjab changed the name of station to Attari Sham Singh railway station after Sham Singh Atariwala who was general in the Sikh Empire.

The railway station

Attari is the last station in India on the Amritsar–Lahore line.

History
The Scinde, Punjab & Delhi Railway completed the Multan–Lahore–Amritsar line in 1865. Amritsar–Attari section was completed on the route to Lahore in 1862.

Trans-Asian Railway

Currently, all freight traffic originating from Asia destined for Europe goes by sea. The Trans-Asian Railway will enable containers from Singapore, China, Vietnam, Cambodia, India, Bangladesh, Myanmar, Thailand and Korea to travel over land by train to Europe. The Southern Corridor of the Trans-Asian Railway is of prime interest to India. It connects Yunnan in China and Thailand with Europe via Turkey and passes through India.

The proposed route will enter India through Tamu and Moreh in Manipur bordering Myanmar, then enter Bangladesh through  and Shabajpur and again enter India from Bangladesh at Gede. On the western side, the line will enter Pakistan at Attari. There is a  missing link on this route in the India–Myanmar sector; of this, in India, is between Jiribam in Manipur and Tamu in Myanmar. The rail link between Jiribam and Imphal has been sanctioned by Indian Railways, but that is unlikely to be completed before 2016. At present construction work is in progress in a  stretch between Jiribam and Tupul.

Station layout

Major trains

Some of the important trains that runs from Attari are :

 Samjhauta Express
 Amritsar–Attari DEMU
 Jabalpur–Attari Special Fare Special
 Amritsar–Attari Passenger

See also

References

External links

Trains at Attari

Railway stations in Amritsar district
Firozpur railway division
Railway stations opened in 1862
1862 establishments in India